Hoàng Vân (24 July 1930, Hanoi – 4 February 2018) is a Vietnamese songwriter and composer. He was a recipient of the Hồ Chí Minh Prize in 2000.

Life
His birth name is Lê Văn Ngọ. Born on 24 July 1930 in Hanoi into a Confucian family, both his grandfather and father were Confucian scholars. He is best known as a composer of the two Indochina wars. He was a soldier in Dien Bien Phu before being sent to train in European classical music at the Central Conservatory of Music in Beijing at the end of the war.  

After his return to Vietnam, he was the conductor of the Radio Orchestra (Voice of Vietnam), as well as lecturing at the composition faculty of the Ha Noi Conservatory of Music (now the Vietnam National Academy of Music) until 1989. He was also a member of the Vietnam Musicians Association and worked there until 1996.

Hoàng Vân was known by the public through his songs, but he also composed symphonies (notably Thành Đồng Tổ quốc, The Bronze Citadel of my Fatherland), in 1960), choirs, instrumental ensemble, music for films, plays...

Works

Songs 
Hoàng Vân is one of the best famous Vietnamese composers from the '60s and his songs are still very popular until today. Among the most sung we can mention:

Music for cinema 
During 20 years he composed music for movies

Con chim vành khuyên

Vĩ tuyến 17 ngày và đêm

Nổi gió

Em bé Hà Nội

Mối tình đầu...

Ballet 
Chị Sứ

Symphonies 
Thành đồng tổ quốc (1960), Bronze castle (poème symphonique), N°1

Điện Biên Phủ, symphonie with choral (2004), Reminiscence II or 5th symphony, 3 mouvements, N°4

Symphonie pour les soldats N°2, 4 mouvements, 1991 (unpublished)

Poème symphonique N°3, end of 1990's (unpublished)

Sinfonia Lyrica N°5, 2010,(unpublished)

Music for theater 
Nila

Choral, works for orchestra   
Hồi tưởng,

Việt Nam muôn năm

Vượt núi

Tuổi lên mười

Hát dưới cờ búa liềm

Thành phố chúng ta nhà máy chúng ta...

Chamber music 
Fugue for piano

Suite for hautboy and piano

Rhapsodie cho violon

Solo for basson "Hành khúc con voi" (elephant marche),

Solo for flute "Vui được mùa"

Hoa thơm bướm lượn

Concerto for piano and orchestra

Epic 
Hà Nội - Huế - Sài Gòn

Bài thơ gửi Thái Nguyên (text Lê Nguyên)

Việt Nam muôn năm

Tôi là người thợ lò

References 

1930 births
2018 deaths
People from Hanoi
Vietnamese composers
Ho Chi Minh Prize recipients